Sarifuddin Sudding (born 6 August 1966, also "Syarifuddin Sudding") is an Indonesian politician. He currently serves as a member of the People's Representative Council.

References

1966 births
Living people
Members of the People's Representative Council, 2019
Indonesian politicians
Place of birth missing (living people)